Oueffin, also spelt Ouefin, is a commune in the Gounghin Department of Kouritenga Province in the Centre-Est region of Burkina Faso. It had a population of 818 in 2006.

The village has a primary school, l'École Oueffin, which was established in 2010.

Demographics

Neighbourhoods

References 

Populated places in the Centre-Est Region